Bo Qin (Chinese: , p Bóqín), also known as Qin Fu (禽父), was the founder of the State of Lu during the early Zhou dynasty.

Born into the royal Ji family, he was the eldest son of the Duke of Zhou. Instead of inheriting his father's estate in Zhou, he was granted the newly established State of Lu centered at Qufu. He is thought to have ruled Lu from around 1042 to 997 BC. His posthumous name was the Great Duke (Tàigōng).

He was succeeded by his sons Duke Kao and Duke Yang.

The main line of the Duke of Zhou's descendants came from Bo Qin's third son Yu (魚) whose descendants adopted the surname Dongye (東野). The Duke of Zhou's offspring held the title of Wujing Boshi (五经博士; 五經博士; Wǔjīng Bóshì).

Duke Huan of Lu's son through Qingfu (慶父) was the ancestor of Mencius. He was descended from Duke Yang of the State of Lu 魯煬公 Duke Yang was the son of Bo Qin. The genealogy is found in the Mencius family tree (孟子世家大宗世系).

References

1068 BC births
998 BC deaths
Chinese dukes
11th-century BC Chinese monarchs
10th-century BC Chinese monarchs
Monarchs of Lu (state)
Founding monarchs